Wallace Luther "Toots" Shultz (October 10, 1888 – January 30, 1959) was a Major League Baseball pitcher.

External links
Baseball-Reference.com

Philadelphia Phillies players
1888 births
1959 deaths
Baseball players from Pennsylvania
Buffalo Bisons (minor league) players
Sacramento Sacts players
Providence Grays (minor league) players
Seattle Rainiers players
Los Angeles Angels (minor league) players